Mount Pisgah is a  mountain in Essex County on the northern edge of the village of Saranac Lake. The mountain is privately owned. There is a small, dispersed housing development on the south side, communications towers on the summit, and a village ski area on the north side.

It is one of three small mountains surrounding Saranac Lake: the others are Baker Mountain and Dewey Mountain. The name comes from the Bible: it was the mountain east of Jordan from which Moses was permitted to view the promised land. In the 1890s it was called Jenkins Hill.

In 1952, poet, novelist and short story writer Sylvia Plath broke her leg skiing on Mount Pisgah while visiting her boyfriend, Dick Norton, who was curing at New York State Sanatorium at Ray Brook. She fictionalized this incident in her novel The Bell Jar.

References

Mountains of Essex County, New York